Sandra Betschart (born 30 March 1989) is a Swiss footballer who plays as a defender for German club MSV Duisburg and the Switzerland national team.

Club career
Betschart joined FC Zürich in 2005, having previously played for SC Cham and FC Malters. After playing for Zürich for five years, in 2011 she moved to Kristianstads DFF in Sweden's Damallsvenskan. Following the end of the season, she was transferred to FC Yverdon back in Switzerland, where she played the second half of the 2011–12 Nationalliga before signing for VfL Sindelfingen, a newly promoted team in the German Bundesliga. The midfielder announced her re-signing with VfL Sindelfingen on 25 March 2013. The Switzerland national team member Betschart signed then on 27 March 2013 with Sunnanå SK, a one-year contract running from 1 April 2013.

She returned to Germany for the second half of the 2015–16 season to play for MSV Duisburg of the 2. Bundesliga. The team was promoted back to the Bundesliga for the 2016–17 season.

International career
She made her senior debut for the Swiss national team in February 2007 against Malta. As of January 2013 she had played 49 games and scored two goals since.

Honours
FC Zürich
 Nationalliga A (2): 2008–09, 2009–10

References

External links
 
 

1989 births
Living people
Sportspeople from Lucerne
Swiss women's footballers
Switzerland women's international footballers
Kristianstads DFF players
Sunnanå SK players
MSV Duisburg (women) players
Damallsvenskan players
Swiss expatriate women's footballers
Swiss expatriate sportspeople in Sweden
Swiss expatriate sportspeople in Germany
Expatriate women's footballers in Sweden
Expatriate women's footballers in Germany
2015 FIFA Women's World Cup players
Frauen-Bundesliga players
FC Zürich Frauen players
Swiss Women's Super League players
Women's association football defenders
Women's association football midfielders
UEFA Women's Euro 2017 players